The Jesuits (Society of Jesus) in the Catholic Church have founded and managed a number of educational institutions, including the notable secondary schools, colleges and universities listed here.

Some of these universities are in the United States where they are organized as the Association of Jesuit Colleges and Universities. In Latin America, they are organized in the Association of Universities Entrusted to the Society of Jesus in Latin America.

List of Jesuit universities
This list includes four-year colleges and universities operated by the Society of Jesus. The currently listed total on this page is 189 colleges and universities. Paul Grendler has authored a history of Jesuit schools and universities from 1548 to 1773. In it, he notes that the Jesuits had established over 700 colleges and universities across Europe by 1749, with another hundred in the rest of the world, but in the aftermath of the Jesuit suppressions of the 18th and 19th centuries, all these schools were closed. The following schools were established in the post-suppression period. Secondary schools, along with sixth forms, are contained in the listing following this one. The listings are in alphabetical order by country.

Argentina (4)
 Universidad de Buenos Aires, Argentina
 Facultades de Filosofía y Teología de San Miguel, San Miguel
 Universidad Católica de Córdoba, Cordoba
 Universidad del Salvador, Buenos Aires

Belgium (4)
 University of Namur
 Institut Gramme
 St John Berchmans University College, Heverlee
 Saint Ignatius University Centre (UCSIA), Antwerp

Belize (1)
 St. John's Junior College, Belize City

Bolivia (1)
Luis Espinal Higher Institute of Philosophy and Humanities, Cochabamba

Brazil (5)
 Centro Universitário da FEI (FEI), São Bernardo do Campo
 Jesuit School of Philosophy and Theology (FAJE), Minas Gerais
 Pontificia Universidade Católica do Rio de Janeiro (PUC-Rio), Rio de Janeiro
 Universidade Católica de Pernambuco (UNICAP), Recife
 Universidade do Vale do Rio dos Sinos (UNISINOS), São Leopoldo

Canada (5)
 St. Paul's College, University of Manitoba
 Saint Mary's University, Halifax
 Regis College, theological faculty, University of Toronto
 Loyola College, now a campus of Concordia University, Montreal
 Campion College, Regina, University of Regina

Chile (1)
 Universidad Alberto Hurtado, Santiago

China (2)
Aurora University (Shanghai) (1902–1952)
The Beijing Center for Chinese Studies (TBC), Beijing

Colombia (2)
 Pontificia Universidad Javeriana, Bogotá
 Pontificia Universidad Javeriana, Cali

Croatia (1)
 Faculty of Philosophy and Religious Sciences, Zagreb

Democratic Republic of Congo (1)
 College Bonsomi, Kinshasa
 Loyola University of Congo, Kinshasa

Dominican Republic (3)
 Loyola Polytechnic Institute, San Cristóbal
 Loyola College of Santo Domingo
 Pedro Francisco Bono Institute, Santo Domingo

Ecuador (1)
 Pontificia Universidad Católica del Ecuador

El Salvador (1)
 Universidad Centroamericana "José Simeón Cañas", San Salvador

France (2)
 Centre Sèvres, Paris
 College of Clermont, Paris

Germany (4)
 Munich School of Philosophy, Munich
 Jesuit College of Ingolstadt, closed in 1773
 Philosophisch-Theologische Hochschule Sankt Georgen, Frankfurt
 University of Ingolstadt, Ingolstadt – closed in 1800

Guatemala (1)
 Universidad Rafael Landívar, Guatemala City

India

Andhra Pradesh
 St. Xavier's College of Education, Hindupur
 Andhra Loyola College, Vijayawada
 Loyola Public School, Guntur

Bihar
 St. Xavier's College, Patna
 St. Xavier's College of Education, Patna

Goa 
 St. Xavier's College, Mapusa

Gujarat
 St. Xavier's College, Ahmedabad

Jharkhand
 Loyola College of Education, Jamshedpur
 St. Xavier's College, Maharo, Dumka
 St. Xavier's College, Ranchi
 Xavier Institute of Social Service, Ranchi
 XLRI - Xavier School of Management, Jamshedpur

Karnataka
 Loyola College, Manvi, Raichur
 Loyola Industrial Training Institute, Bangalore
 St. Aloysius College, Harihar
 St. Aloysius College, Mangalore
 St. Aloysius Evening College (Mangalore)
 St. Aloysius Industrial Training Institute, Mangalore
 St. Aloysius Institute of Education, Mangalore
 St. Joseph's Institutions, Bangalore
 St. Joseph's College (Autonomous), Bangalore
 St. Joseph's College, Hassan
 St. Joseph's College of Commerce (Autonomous). Bangalore 
 St. Joseph's Community College, Bangalore
 St. Joseph's Evening College (Autonomous), Bangalore
 St. Joseph’s College of Law, Bangalore
 St. Joseph's Institute of Management, Bangalore

Kerala
Loyola School, Trivandrum
 Loyola College of Social Sciences, Thiruvananthapuram
 St. Xavier's College, Thumba, Thiruvananthapuram
 Loyola School Mukandhara. 
 Loyola Institute Of Commerce, Poovar 
 AKJM, higher secondary school, Kanjirapalli. 
 Pius X Private Industrial Training Institute, Edathua
 St. Joseph higher secondary School, Kozhikode. 
 St. Joseph Junior School, Kozhikode, 
 Christ the King School, Kozhikode. 
 St. Micheal Anglo Indian Higher Secondary School, Kannur. 
 Nirmala Private Industrial Training Institute, Pariyaram

Madhya Pradesh
Xavier Institute of Development Action and Studies (XIDAS), Jabalpur

Maharashtra
 Dnyanmata Vidyalaya, Sangamner, Ahmednagar
 St. Joseph’s Technical Institute, Pune
 St. Vincent College of Commerce, Camp, Pune
St. Xavier's College, Mumbai
 St. Xavier's Institute of Education, Mumbai
 St. Xavier's Technical Institute, Mumbai
 Xavier Institute of Engineering, Mumbai
 Xavier Institute of Management & Research, Mumbai
 Campion School, Mumbai

Odisha
 Xavier Institute of Management, Bhubaneswar
 XIM University, Bhubaneswar

Rajasthan
 St Xaviers College, Jaipur
 St. Xavier's College, Nevta, Jaipur

Tamil Nadu
 Loyola College; Chennai
 Loyola-ICAM College of Engineering & Technology; Chennai
 Loyola College; Chennai
   Loyola College, Vetavalam|Loyola Vetavalam; Vetavalam
 Loyola College; Mettala
 Loyola Institute of Business Administration; Chennai
   St. Xavier's Art and Science College; Palayamkottai
 St. Xavier's College of Education; Palayamkottai
 Xavier Institute of Business Administration; Palayamkottai 
 Arulanandhar college, (autonomous) Karmathur, Madurai. 
 St.Joseph's College, (autonomous) Trichy.

Telangana
 Loyola Academy, Secunderabad
 Loyola English Medium High School, Suryapet
 Loyola High School, Karimnagar
 St. Patrick's High School, Secunderabad

West Bengal
 St. Xavier's School, Durgapur
 North Bengal St. Xavier's College, Jalpaiguri
 St. Joseph's College, Darjeeling
 St. Xavier's College, Asansol
 St. Xavier's College, Burdwan
 St. Xavier's College, Kolkata
 St. Xavier's College, Raghabpur
 St. Xavier's University, Kolkata

Indonesia (2)
 Sanata Dharma University, Yogyakarta
 Polytechnic ATMI Surakarta, Surakarta

Iraq (1)
 Al Hikma College – nationalized during the Baath regime

Italy (5)
 John Felice Rome Center, Loyola University Chicago, Rome
 Pontifical Biblical Institute, Rome
 Pontifical Gregorian University, Rome – formerly Collegio Romano
 Pontifical Oriental Institute, Rome
University of Messina (Ignatian origins)

Japan (2)
 Elisabeth University of Music, Hiroshima
 Sophia University, Tokyo

Kenya (1)
 Hekima University College, Nairobi

Lebanon (2)
 Université Saint-Joseph, Beirut
 Collège Notre Dame de Jamhour, Baabda

Madagascar (4)
 Ecole Professionnelle Supérieure Agricole Bevalala, Antananarivo
 Saint Michael Higher Technical Institute, Amparibe, Antananarivo
 Saint Paul Tsaramasoandro Philosophate, Antananarivo
 SAMIS-ESIC School of Information and Communication, Antananarivo

Malta (1)
 Collegium Melitense, Valletta (1592–1768, predecessor of the University of Malta)

Mexico (7)
 Ibero-American University of Torreón, Torreón
 Ibero-American University Tijuana, Tijuana
 Universidad Iberoamericana, Mexico City
 Universidad Iberoamericana León, León
 Universidad Iberoamericana Puebla, Puebla de Zaragoza
 Intercultural Institute of Ayuuk, Oaxaca
 ITESO, Universidad Jesuita de Guadalajara

Myanmar(2)
 Campion Institute for English Language in Yangon, Myanmar
 St Aloysius Gonzaga Institute of Higher Studies in Taunggyi, Shan, Myanmar

Nepal (1)
 St. Xavier's College, Maitighar, Kathmandu

New Zealand (1)

 Holy Name Seminary, Christchurch (closed in 1978)

Nicaragua (1)
 Central American University, Managua

Paraguay (1)
 Higher Institute of Humanistic and Philosophical Studies, Asunción

Peru (2)
 Antonio Ruiz de Montoya University, Lima
 Universidad del Pacífico, Lima

Philippines (8)
 

 Ateneo de Davao University, Davao City
 Ateneo de Manila University, Quezon City, Metro Manila 
 Ateneo de Naga University, Naga City Camarines Sur
 Ateneo de Tuguegarao, Tuguegarao City, Cagayan (closed in 1962)
 Ateneo de Zamboanga University, Zamboanga City, Zamboanga del Sur
 Ateneo de Cagayan - Xavier University, Cagayan de Oro, Misamis Oriental
 Loyola College of Culion, Culion, Palawan
 San Jose Seminary, Quezon City, Metro Manila

Poland (1)
 Collegium Nobilium (Jesuit) in Warsaw
 Jesuit University Ignatianum in Kraków
 Collegium Bobolanum in Warsaw - a part of the Catholic Academy in Warsaw

Romania (1)
 Jesuit Academy of Cluj, (from university, after 1773)

South Korea (1)
 Sogang University, Seoul, South Korea

Spain (8)
 Comillas Pontifical University, Madrid
 Deusto University, Bilbao
 ESADE Barcelona, also in Madrid
 IQS - Institut Químic de Sarrià, Barcelona
 Holy Family University Center, Úbeda
 Loyola University of Andalusia
 Saint Louis University Madrid Campus
 University of Agricultural Engineering, Valladolid

Taiwan (1)
 Fu Jen Catholic University, Taipei

Thailand (1)
 Xavier Learning Community (XLC), Chiang Rai, Thailand

Timor-Leste (1)
 St. John de Britto Institute (Instituto São João de Brito), Kasait-Ulmera, East Timor

United Kingdom (2)
 Campion Hall, Oxford University, Oxford
 Heythrop College, University of London, London

United States (29)
 Boston College, Chestnut Hill, Massachusetts
 Boston College School of Theology and Ministry, Brighton, Massachusetts
 Canisius College, Buffalo, New York
 College of the Holy Cross, Worcester, Massachusetts
 Le Moyne College, Syracuse, New York 
 Spring Hill College, Mobile, Alabama 
 Creighton University, Omaha, Nebraska
 Fairfield University, Fairfield, Connecticut
 Fordham University, New York City 
 Georgetown University, Washington, D.C.
 Gonzaga University, Spokane, Washington
 Jesuit School of Theology of Santa Clara University, Berkeley, California
 John Carroll University, University Heights, Ohio
 Loyola Marymount University, Los Angeles, California
 Loyola University Chicago, Chicago, Illinois
 Loyola University Maryland, Baltimore, Maryland
 Loyola University New Orleans, New Orleans, Louisiana
 Marquette University, Milwaukee, Wisconsin
 Regis University, Denver, Colorado
 Rockhurst University, Kansas City, Missouri
 Saint Joseph's University, Philadelphia, Pennsylvania
 Saint Louis University, St. Louis, Missouri
 Saint Peter's University, Jersey City, New Jersey
 Santa Clara University, Santa Clara, California
 Seattle University, Seattle, Washington
 University of Detroit Mercy, Detroit, Michigan
 University of San Francisco, San Francisco, California
 University of Scranton, Scranton, Pennsylvania
 Xavier University, Cincinnati, Ohio

Uruguay (1)
 Universidad Católica del Uruguay, Montevideo

Venezuela (3)
 Jesus the Worker University Institute, Caracas
 Universidad Católica Andrés Bello, Caracas
 Catholic University of Tachira, San Cristóbal

Zambia (1)
 Charles Lwanga College of Education, Chisekesi

Zimbabwe (1)
 Arrupe Jesuit University, Harare, Zimbabwe

List of Jesuit secondary schools
Below are listed notable Jesuit high schools or secondary schools, many of which grew into Jesuit colleges or universities, or formed in association with them. This list includes schools at the sixth form level, as distinguished from four-year colleges and universities (above).

Albania
 Pjeter Meshkalla High School, Shkoder

Angola
 Celia Mendez Mbanza-Kongo

Argentina
 Colegio del Salvador (Argentina), Buenos Aires

Australia

New South Wales
 St Aloysius' College, Sydney
 Saint Ignatius' College, Riverview, Sydney

South Australia
 Saint Ignatius' College, Athelstone, Adelaide

Victoria
 Saint Ignatius College Geelong, Drysdale
 Xavier College, Melbourne

Austria
 Aloysian College, Linz
 Kalksburg College, Vienna
 Stella Matutina, Feldkirch, 1651–1979

Belgium

 Collège Matteo Ricci, Brussels
 Collège Notre-Dame de la Paix, Namur
 Collège Saint-Paul (Godinne)
 Collège Saint-Servais (Liège)
 Collège Saint-Stanislas, Mons
 Collège Saint-François-Xavier, Verviers
 John of Ruysbroeck College, Laeken
 Our Lady College, Antwerp
 Sint-Barbaracollege
 St John Berchmans College, Brussels
 St Joseph College, Aalst
 St Joseph College, Turnhout
 St Michael College, Brussels
 Xaverius College

Belize
 St. John's College, Belize City

Bolivia
 Colegio del Sagrado Corazón, Sucre
 John XXIII College, Cochabamba
 Colegio San Calixto, La Paz
 Colegio San Ignacio, La Paz

Brazil
 Anchieta College (New Fribourg), RJ
 Anchieta College (Porto Alegre), RS
 Antonio Vieira College, Salvador, BA
 College of Our Lady Mediatrix, Curitiba, PR
 Diocesan College (Teresina), PI
 FMC Electronic Technical School, Santa Rita do Sapucaí, MG
 Jesuit College, Juiz de Fora, MG
 Loyola College, Belo Horizonte, MG
 Saint Catherine College, Florianópolis, SC
 St. Alphonsus Rodriguez School (ESAR), Teresina, PI
 St. Francis Xavier College, San Paulo, SP
 St. Ignatius College, Fortaleza, CE
 St. Ignatius College, Rio de Janeiro, RJ
 St. Louis College, São Paulo, SP

Burundi
 Holy Spirit Lycée, Bujumbura

Cambodia
 Xavier Jesuit School, Banteay Meanchey province, Cambodia

Cameroon
 Collège Libermann,  Douala, Cameroon

Canada
 Brebeuf College School, Toronto
 Loyola High School, Montreal
 St. Bonaventure's College, St. John's City
 St. Paul's High School, Winnipeg

Chad
 Collège St François Xavier, Ndjamena, Chad

Chile
 St. Francis Xavier College, Puerto Montt
 St. Ignatius College, Alonso Ovalle, Santiago
 St. Ignatius El Bosque, Santiago
 St. Aloysius College, Antofagasta
 St. Matthew College, Osorno

Colombia
 Berchmans College, Cali
 St. Bartholomew Major College, Bogotá
 Colegio San Bartolomé la Merced, Bogotá
 St. Francis Xavier College, Pasto
 Colegio San Pedro Claver, Bucaramanga
 St. Aloysius College, Manizales
 St. Ignatius Loyola College, Medellin
 St. Joseph College, Barranquilla

Croatia
 Jesuit Classical Gymnasium in Osijek

Democratic Republic of Congo
Boboto College, Gombe
Bonsomi collège, Kinshasa

Ecuador
 Christ the King School, Portoviejo
 St. Gabriel College, Quito
 Xavier, Guayaquil
 Borja School, Cuenca

Egypt
 College de la Sainte Famille, Cairo

El Salvador
 Arrupe College, El Salvador, San Salvador
 Externado San José, San Salvador

Ethiopia
 Abay Mado Catholic Academy, Bahir Dar City,  Amhara State

Federated States of Micronesia
 Xavier High School, Chuuk

France
 Lycée la Providence, Amiens
 Lycée privé Sainte-Geneviève, Versailles
 Lycée Saint-Joseph-de-Tivoli
 Lycée Saint-Joseph of Avignon
 Lycée Saint-Louis-de-Gonzague, Paris
 Lycée Saint-Marc, Lyon
 Fénelon - La Trinité School, Lyon
 Provence School, Marseille
 Le Marais Sainte-Thérèse Professional School, Saint-Étienne
 Caousou School, Toulouse
 Saint-Joseph of Reims
 Sainte Marie La Grand’Grange, Saint-Chamond

Germany
 Aloisiuskolleg (gymnasium), Bonn
 Canisius-Kolleg Berlin (gymnasium), Berlin
 Kolleg St. Blasien (gymnasium), Black Forest

Guatemala
 Xavier Lyceum, Guatemala, Guatemala City
 Loyola College Guatemala, Guatemala City

Hong Kong
 Wah Yan College, Hong Kong
 Wah Yan College, Kowloon

Hungary
 Fényi Gyula Jesuit High School, Miskolc

India

Andhra Pradesh
 Loyola High School, Hindupur
 Loyola High School, KD Peta
 Loyola High School, Vinukonda
 Andhra Loyola College Vijayawada
 Loyola Public School, Loyola Nagar, Guntur
 St. John's High School, Amalapuram
 St. Patrick's High School, Secunderabad
 St. Xavier's High School, Darsi

Bihar
 St. Michael's High School, Patna
 St. Xavier's High School, Patna
 St. Xavier's Higher Secondary School, Bettiah
 Khrist Raja High School, Bettiah

Delhi
 St. Xavier's School, Delhi
 St. Xavier's School, Rohini

Goa
Loyola High School, Margao
Saint Britto High School, Mapusa

Gujarat
St. Xavier's High School, Mirzapur, Ahmedabad
St. Xavier's High School, Loyola Hall, Ahmedabad
St. Xavier's High School, Surat

Jharkhand
De Nobili School, Bhuli, Dhanbad
De Nobili School, CMRI, Dhanbad
De Nobili School CTPS, Bokaro, Chandrapura
De Nobili School, FRI, Digwadih, Dhanbad
De Nobili School, Maithon, Dhanbad
De Nobili School, Mugma, Dhanbad
De Nobili School, Sijua
De Nobili School, Sindri, Dhanbad
Loyola Collegiate School, Jamshedpur
Loyola School, Jamshedpur
St. John's High School, Ranchi
St. Xavier's English School, Chakradharpur
St. Xavier's School, Ranchi
St. Xavier's School, Bokaro
St. Xavier’s School, Sahibganj

Karnataka
 Loyola Pre-University College, Manvi, Raichur
 Loyola School & PU College, Mundgod
 St. Aloysius PU College, Harihar
 St. Joseph's Boys High School, Bangalore
 St. Joseph's Indian High School, Bangalore
 St. Joseph's Pre-University College, Bangalore
 St. Joseph School, Anekal
 St. Joseph's PU College, Anekal
 St. Joseph's School, Hassan
 St. Paul's School, Belgaum
 St. Xavier's PU College, Gulbarga
 Xavier School, Manvi, Raichur

Kerala
Loyola School, Thiruvananthapuram
AKJM Public School, Kanjirappally, Kottayam
St. Michael’s School, Kannur

Madhya Pradesh
Campion School Bhopal, Madhya Pradesh

Maharashtra
 Loyola High School, Pune
 Campion School, Mumbai
 Campion High School (ICSE – Colaba)*
 Dnyanmata Vidyalaya, Sangamner, Ahmednagar
 Prabodhan Vidyalaya School, Amravati
 Holy Family High School, Mumbai
 Holy Family High School (Andheri)*
 St. Vincent's High School, Pune
 St. Stanislaus High School, Mumbai
 St. Stanislaus High School (Bandra)*
 St. Mary's High School SSC, Mumbai
 St. Mary's School, Mumbai ICSE, Mumbai
 St. Mary's School, Sangamner, Ahmednagar
 St. Mary’s High School (Mazagaon)*
 St. Xavier's Boys' Academy, Mumbai
 St. Xavier's High School, Fort Fort, Mumbai
 St. Xavier's High School, Manickpur
 St. Xavier's High School, Nashik
 St. Xavier's School, Kolhapur
 St.Xavier's School,Pune
Jesuit Schools in Greater Mumbai:

Odisha
Loyola School, Bhubaneswar
Loyola School, Baripada
Loyola School, Kalinganagar
St. Joseph's School, Kendrapara
St. Xavier's School, Rutungia, Kandhamal

Rajasthan
 St. Xavier's School, Behror
 St. Xavier's School, Bhiwadi
 St. Xavier's School, Jaipur
 St. Xavier's High School, Mahua
 St. Xavier's School, Nevta

Tamil Nadu
 Carmel Higher Secondary School, Nagercoil
 De Britto Higher Secondary School, Devakottai
 Loyola College, Mettala, Namakkal
 Loyola Academy, Maraimalai Nagar, Chennai
 Loyola Higher Secondary School, Kuppayanallur
 St. Arul Anandar School, Oriyur
 St. Joseph Boys Higher Secondary School, Trichy
 St. Mary's Higher Secondary School, Dindigul
 St. Mary’s Higher Secondary School, Madurai
 St. Xavier's Higher Secondary School, Palayamkottai
 St. Xavier's Higher Secondary School, Thoothukudi
 St. Joseph's College, Tiruchirappalli
 Loyola College, Chennai

Telangana
 Loyola High School, Karimnagar
 St. Xavier's High School, Suryapet

West Bengal
Loyola High School (Kolkata)
St. Joseph's School, Darjeeling
St. Lawrence High School, Kolkata
St. Xavier's Collegiate School, Kolkata
St. Xavier's School, Burdwan
St. Xavier's School, Durgapur
St. Xavier’s School, Haldia
St. Xavier’s School, Raiganj

Indonesia
 De Britto High School Yogyakarta, Yogyakarta
 Kolese Gonzaga, South Jakarta
 Kolese Kanisius, Central Jakarta
 Kolese Loyola, Semarang
 College Le Cocq d'Armandville, Nabire, Papua
 St. Michael Technical School, Surakarta
 PIKA Industrial Woodworking School, Semarang
 Peter Canisius Minor Seminary Mertoyudan, Magelang 
 Wacana Bhakti Seminary, Jakarta

Iraq
 Baghdad College, Baghdad (nationalized 1969)

Ireland
 Belvedere College, Dublin
 Clongowes Wood College, County Kildare
 Crescent College Comprehensive, County Limerick
 Gonzaga College, Dublin
 Coláiste Iognáid, Galway

Italy
 Leo XIII Institute, Milan
 Social Institute, Turin
 Massimiliano Massimo Institute, Rome
 House of the Savior, Naples
 Gonzaga Institute, Palermo
 St. Ignatius College, Messina
 Jesuit College, Messina

Jamaica
 Campion College, Kingston
 St. George's College, Kingston

Japan
 Eiko Gakuen, Kamakura
 Hiroshima Academy Junior and Senior High School, Hiroshima
 Rokko Junior and Senior High School, Kobe
 Sophia Fukuoka Junior and Senior High School, Fukuoka

Kosovo
 Loyola Gymnasium Prizren

Lebanon
 Collège Notre Dame de Jamhour, Beirut

Lithuania
 Kaunas Jesuit Gymnasium, Kaunas
 Vilnius Jesuit High School, Vilnius
 Šiauliai Jesuit School, Šiauliai

Madagascar
 Immaculate Conception College, Mananjary
 Xavier College, Madagascar, Fianarantsoa
 College of Saint Michael, Amparibe, Antananarivo
 École Technique et Lycée Technique de Bevalala, Antananarivo
 Collège Saint François-Xavier, Ambatomena, Fianarantsoa

Malawi
 Loyola Jesuit Secondary School, Malawi, Kasungu

Malta
 St Aloysius' College, Birkirkara

Mexico
 Carlos Pereyra School, Torreon, Coahuila
 East Institute of Puebla
 Ibero College Tijuana, Baja California
 Instituto Cultural Tampico, Tampico, Tamaulipas
 Lux Institute, León, Guanajuato
 San Ildefonso College, Mexico City (1588–1767)
 Science Institute of Jalisco, Guadalajara

Micronesia
 Xavier High School, Chuuk, Micronesia
 Yap Catholic High School Rull, Yap, Micronesia
 Pohnpei Agricultural and Trade School, Pohnpei, Micronesia

Mozambique
 St. Ignatius Loyola High School, Msaladzi

Nepal
   St. Xavier’s School, Deonia
 St. Xavier's School, Godavari
 St. Xavier's School, Jawalakhel
   St. Xavier’s School, Sadakbari 
   Loyola School, Simalbari
   Moran Memorial School, Maheshpur

Netherlands
 St. Stanislaus College, Delft
Formerly:
 Aloysius College, The Hague
 Canisius College, Nijmegen
 Ignatius Gymnasium, Amsterdam
 Catholic Comprehensive School, Breul, Zeist
 Maartenscollege, Groningen
 Bonaventure College, Leiden

Nicaragua
 Colegio Centro América, Managua 
 Instituto Loyola, Managua

Nigeria

 Loyola Jesuit College, Abuja
 St. Francis Catholic Secondary School, Lagos
 Jesuit Memorial College, Port Harcourt
 Gonzaga Jesuit College, Okija Anambra State, Nigeria (Added by Mr. Innocent O. Okwara)]
 [Arrupe Jesuit College, Abbi, Delta State]

Pakistan

Panama
 Xavier College, Panama

Paraguay
 Colegio Cristo Rey, Asunción
 Xavier Technical College, Asunción

Peru
 Colegio Cristo Rey, Asunción
 Cristo Rey College, Tacna
 Colegio de la Inmaculada, Lima
 Colegio San José, Arequipa

Philippines

 Ateneo de San Pablo, San Pablo City, Laguna (closed in 1978)
 Ateneo de Iloilo – Santa Maria Catholic School, Iloilo City, Iloilo
 Sacred Heart School – Ateneo de Cebu, Mandaue City, Cebu
 Xavier School San Juan, San Juan, Metro Manila
 Fr. Pierre Tritz Institute-ERDA Tech, Pandacan, Manila, Metro Manila

Poland
St. Stanislaus Jesuit High School, Gdynia
Saint Stanislaw Kostka Jesuit Primary and High School in Gdynia
Jesuit Primary and Highs School in Nowy Sacz
KOSTKA Jesuit Public High School in Kraków
Jesuit Public Primary School in Myslowiece
 Catholic Academy in Warsaw "Bobolanum", Warsaw

Portugal
 St. John de Britto College, Lisbon

Puerto Rico
 Colegio San Ignacio de Loyola

Romania
 Jesuit College of Sibiu, closed in 1773

Rwanda
 St. Ignatius School, Kigali
 Centre Educatif Mizero, Cyangugu

South Sudan
 Loyola Secondary School, Wau, South Sudan

Spain
 Claver College, Raimat
 Colegio Casp-Sagrado Corazón de Jesús, Barcelona
 Colegio de la Inmaculada, Gijón
 College of San Jose, Villafranca de los Barros
 College of the Savior, Zaragoza
 College of the Immaculate, Alicante
 Cristo Rey Polytechnic Institute, Valladolid
 Francis Borgia College, Gandia
 Immaculate Heart of Mary College, Portaceli, Sevilla
 Jesus the Worker, Vitoria
 John XXIII School, Bellvitge, Hospitalet de Llobregat
 Kostka College, Barcelona
 Kostka College Santander
 Nazareth College, Alicante
 Our Lady of Begoña College, Bilbao
 Our Lady of Mount Zion College, Palma, Majorca
 Our Lady of Remembrance College, Madrid
 Sacred Heart Jesuit School of Leon
 Sacred Heart School, Logroño
 San Jose College, Durango
 San Jose College, Valladolid
 San Jose Schools, Valencia
 San Jose Secondary Educational Center, Málaga
 St. Francis Xavier School, Burgos
 St. Ignatius College, Barcelona
 St. Ignatius College, Oviedo
 St. Ignatius College, Pamplona
 St. Ignatius College, San Sebastian
 St. Ignatius of Loyola College, Alcala de Henares
 St. Ignatius of Loyola College, Las Palmas
 St. James the Apostle College, Vigo
 St. Mary of the Sea College, Corunna
 St. Stanislaus Kostka College, Málaga
 St. Stanislaus Kostka College, Salamanca
 Virgin of Guadalupe College, Badajoz
 Vocational Training Centre Revillagigedo, Gijon
 Xavier College, Santiago de Compostela
 Xavier College, Tudela

Sri Lanka
 Arrupe College. Batticaloa
 St. Aloysius' College,  Galle
 St. Servatius' College, Matara

Tanzania
  Loyola School, Dar es Salaam
  St Ignatius Preparatory and Primary School, Dodoma
  Gonzaga Gonza Primary School, Dar es Salaam
 St. Peter Claver High School, Dodoma

Timor-Leste
 St. Ignatius of Loyola College (Colegio de Santo Inasio de Loiola - CSIL), Kasait, Ulmera, Liquiça, Timor Leste
 Our Lady of Fatima Catholic Secondary School (Escola Secundaria Católica Nossa Senhora de Fátima), Railaco, Ermera, Timor Leste

Uganda
Ocer Campion Jesuit College, Gulu

United Kingdom

England
 Barlborough Hall School, Barlborough, Chesterfield, Derbyshire
 Donhead Preparatory School, London
 Mount St Mary's College, Spinkhill, Derbyshire
 St Ignatius' College, Enfield
 St John's Beaumont School (amalgamated into Stoneyhurst College), Berkshire
 St Joseph's School, Hurst Green
 Stonyhurst College, Lancashire
 Stonyhurst Saint Mary's Hall
 Wimbledon College, London

Scotland
 St Aloysius College, Glasgow
 St Aloysius' College Junior School, Glasgow

United States

 Arrupe Jesuit High School, Denver, Colorado
 Belen Jesuit Preparatory School, Miami, Florida
 Bellarmine College Preparatory, San Jose, California
 Bellarmine Preparatory School, Tacoma, Washington
 Boston College High School, Boston, Massachusetts
 Brebeuf Jesuit Preparatory School, Indianapolis, Indiana
 Brooklyn Preparatory School Closed in 1972
 Brophy College Preparatory, Phoenix, Arizona
 Campion High School, Prairie du Chien, Wisconsin, closed in 1975
 Canisius High School, Buffalo, New York
 Cheverus High School, Portland, Maine
 Christ the King Jesuit College Prep High School, Chicago, Illinois
 Creighton Preparatory School, Omaha, Nebraska
 Cristo Rey Atlanta Jesuit High School, Atlanta, Georgia
 Cristo Rey High School, Sacramento, California, with other congregations
 Cristo Rey Jesuit College Preparatory of Houston, Houston, Texas
 Cristo Rey Jesuit High School, Baltimore, Maryland
 Cristo Rey Jesuit High School, Chicago, Illinois
 Cristo Rey Jesuit High School Milwaukee, Milwaukee, Wisconsin
 Cristo Rey Jesuit High School, Minneapolis, Minnesota
 Cristo Rey New York High School, New York City, with other congregations
 Cristo Rey San José Jesuit High School, San Jose, California
 DeSmet Jesuit High School, St. Louis, Missouri
 Fairfield College Preparatory School, Fairfield, Connecticut
 Fordham Preparatory School, Bronx, New York
 Georgetown Preparatory School, Bethesda, Maryland
 Gonzaga College High School, Washington, D.C.
 Gonzaga Preparatory School, Spokane, Washington
 Jesuit College Preparatory School, Dallas, Texas
 Jesuit High School, Beaverton, Oregon
 Jesuit High School, New Orleans, Louisiana
 Jesuit High School, Sacramento, California
 Jesuit High School, Tampa, Florida
 Loyola Academy, Wilmette, Illinois
 Loyola Blakefield, Towson, Maryland
 Loyola High School, Detroit, Michigan
 Loyola High School, Los Angeles, California
 Loyola School, New York City
 Marquette University High School, Milwaukee, Wisconsin
 McQuaid Jesuit High School, Rochester, New York
 Red Cloud High School, Pine Ridge, South Dakota
 Regis High School, New York City
 Regis Jesuit High School, Aurora, Colorado
 Rockhurst High School, Kansas City, Missouri
 Scranton Preparatory School, Scranton, Pennsylvania
 St. Ignatius College Prep, Chicago, Illinois
 St. Ignatius College Preparatory, San Francisco, California
 St. Ignatius High School, Cleveland
 St. John's Jesuit High School and Academy, Toledo, Ohio
 Saint Joseph's Preparatory School, Philadelphia, Pennsylvania
 St. Louis University High School, St. Louis, Missouri
 St. Martin de Porres High School, Cleveland, Ohio
 St. Peter's Preparatory School, Jersey City, New Jersey
 St. Xavier High School, Cincinnati, Ohio
 Seattle Preparatory School, Seattle, Washington
 Strake Jesuit College Preparatory, Houston, Texas
 University of Detroit High School & Academy, Detroit, Michigan
 Verbum Dei High School, Los Angeles, California, Archdiocesan administered by Jesuits
 Walsh Jesuit High School, Cuyahoga Falls, Ohio
 Xavier College Preparatory, Palm Desert, California, Jesuit endorsed
 Xavier High School, New York City

Venezuela
 Gonzaga College, Venezuela, Maracaibo
 Loyola College Gumilla, Puerto Ordaz
 St. Ignatius of Loyola College, Caracas
 Catholic University of Tachira, San Cristobal

Zimbabwe
 Makumbi Visitation High School, Makumbi Mission
 Saint Ignatius College, Chishawasha, Harare
 St George's College, Harare
 St. Paul's High School, Musami
 St. Peter's Kubatana, Glen Norah, Harare
 St. Rupert Mayer's High School, Makonde

See also
 List of alumni of Jesuit educational institutions
 List of schools named after Francis Xavier
 List of Jesuit sites

References

 *
Jesuit institutions
Jesuit institutions